Adelidoria glauca is an insect species from Sri Lanka that was first described by William Forsell Kirby in 1891. It is the only species of the genus  Adelidoria, which is related to the genus Cerynia, but differs in the neuration, etc.

Description

According to Distant, length excluding tegmina 9 to 10 mm; including tegmina 33 to 35 mm. According to Kirby it is 27–31 mm long.
Tegmina are pale bluish grey, hind marginal area is paler; hind wings are more grey and iridescent. Body white, scutellum and legs black. Abdomen covered with white feathery waxy excrescences. 
The frons is longitudinally convex, genae anteriorly rotundate, neither frons nor genae produced in the middle. Ocelli distinct. Antennae: segments of the peduncle elongate, first extending considerably beyond the lateral margins of the genae, second about one-fifth longer than the first. Tegmina are very greatly decumbent, very ample, sensibly widened towards the apex, rotundate, with a single regular series of transverse nervures towards the apex; corium, etc. (except at the base) with numerous transverse nervures; many of the longitudinal nervures furcate. Costal membrane dilated, basally narrowed more than twice as long in the middle as the costal area. Posterior tibiae with one spine. Abdomen compressed.

Biology and behavior
It sometimes covers the leaves of Syzygium trees upon which the larva feeds. When disturbed, it flies away in clouds.

Distribution
It is only known from Sri Lanka.

Sources 

Hemiptera
 glauca